

The Women's Individual standing archery competition at the 2004 Summer Paralympics was held from 21 to 25 September at the Olympic Baseball Centre (Athens).

The event was won by Wang Yanhong, representing .

Results

Ranking Round

Competition bracket

References

W
2004 in women's archery